Sabadell Airport  is located next to the city of Sabadell,  from Barcelona's city centre, in Catalonia. This, and the Cuatro Vientos Airport, are the most important airports for general aviation in Spain. There are more than 200 aircraft registered at this airport, completing around 150.000 operations per year. There are more than 400 people working at these facilities, including training schools, workshops, etc. This airport hosts the oldest aviation club in Spain.

70% of the activity of this airport is devoted to pilot training (both fixed wing and rotary). The other 30% is for advertising flights, photography, and aerotaxi, private flights and institutional flights.

Statistics

References

External links

 Sabadell Airport at Aena website 
 
 Related accidents Sabadell Airport 
 Affectation to the territory 

Airports in Catalonia
Sabadell
Transport in Sabadell
Airports established in 1934
1934 establishments in Spain